Cojani may refer to:

 Cojani, a village in the Romanian town of Târgu Cărbunești
 Kozani, a Greek city known in Aromanian as